Deseilligny is a small lunar impact crater in the southern part of the Mare Serenitatis. It was named after French selenographer Jules Deseilligny. It is located to the east-southeast of the crater Bessel. Deseilligny is a bowl-shaped crater with a low rim. It is otherwise undistinguished.

References

External links

Deseilligny at The Moon Wiki
 LTO-42C1 Deseilligny — L&PI topographic map

Impact craters on the Moon
Mare Serenitatis